"Solaar pleure" ("Solaar weeps") is the 2nd song on the 2001 album Cinquième As by French hip hop artist MC Solaar, and the 1st single. The song is dubbed over in English at the close of the album. The rapper relates his feelings about the current state of the world including his views on poverty and AIDS.

It also provides an allegorical journey after death, going from the expectation of heaven to shock at being sent to hell. This divides the song into two parts as the "heaven" section fades away and then the song begins again with "Non! Pourquoi moi? C'est une erreur! Garde-moi, je suis noble de cœur!" (No! Why me? It's a mistake! Keep me, I am noble at heart) as he is sent to hell.

First release embedded with Opendisc technology.

Track listings

Personnel
 Lyrics : MC Solaar
 Mastered by Black Rose Corporation, Chris Gerhinger
 Mixed by Stephen George
 Music : Alain J, Eric K-Roz
 Photography : Philippe Bordas
 Producer : Black Rose Corporation
 Recorded and mixed by Black Rose Corporation

Certifications

Charts

Weekly charts

Year-end charts

References

External links
 Lyrics in french
 Solaar Pleure on YouTube

2001 singles
MC Solaar songs
2001 songs
Warner Music Group singles